The Thailand's representative senior football team has participated in 7 editions of the AFC Asian Cup.

Overviewing table 

Note
 * : Denotes draws including knockout matches decided on penalty kicks.''

1972 AFC Asian Cup

Group allocation match

Group A

Semi-finals

Third place

1992 AFC Asian Cup

Group B

1996 AFC Asian Cup

Group B

2000 AFC Asian Cup

Group A

2004 AFC Asian Cup

Group D

2007 AFC Asian Cup

Group A

2019 AFC Asian Cup 
Thailand returned to the tournament after being absence in 2011 and 2015. They were drawn in Pot 2.

Group A

Knockout stage

Round of 16

References 

Countries at the AFC Asian Cup